Tomasz Siemoniak (born 2 July 1967) is a Polish politician, Minister of National Defence from 2 August 2011 to 16 November 2015 and Deputy Prime Minister of Poland from 22 September 2014 to 16 November 2015.

Early life and education
Siemoniak was born on 2 July 1967. He graduated from the Foreign Trade Faculty of the Warsaw School of Economics. During his university education, he was the head of the Independent Students’ Association (NZS).

Career
Siemoniak began his career at the Polish public broadcasting unit, Telewizja Polska, as the director of the office for field branches and general director of Channel 1. His tenure lasted from 1994 to 1996. He served as the director of the press and information office at the ministry of national defence from 1998 to 2000. During this period he was also a member of the Warsaw city centre district council and deputy chairman of the culture committee of the council. He was appointed deputy chairman of the supervisory board of the Polish News Agency in 1998, and his tenure ended in 2002. From December 2000 to July 2002 he was also deputy mayor of Warsaw. He was named as a board member of Polskie Radio SA (public radio company) in 2002 and served there until 2006. Then he was appointed deputy marshal in the marshal’s office of the Mazowieckie Voivodeship (November 2006 - November 2007). From November 2007 to August 2011, he held the post of secretary of state in the ministry of interior and administration. Siemoniak is a member of the Civic Platform headed by Donald Tusk.

On 2 August 2011, he was appointed minister of national defense in the cabinet led by the prime minister Donald Tusk. Siemoniak replaced Bogdan Klich in the post. After the elections in October 2011, Tusk reformed the cabinet and Siemoniak retained his post as defense minister.

Activities and views
In August 2012, Siemoniak declared that Poland is planning to form its own missile defense system with an estimated budget of between $3 billion and $6 billion.

References

External links

|-

1967 births
Government ministers of Poland
Living people
People from Wałbrzych
Ministers of National Defence of Poland
Polish economists
SGH Warsaw School of Economics alumni
Deputy Prime Ministers of Poland
Members of the Polish Sejm 2015–2019
Members of the Polish Sejm 2019–2023